St. John's Episcopal Church is a church and historic church building located in Toledo, Oregon, United States.

The church was listed on the National Register of Historic Places in 1990.

See also
National Register of Historic Places listings in Lincoln County, Oregon

References

External links

Episcopal churches in Oregon
Churches on the National Register of Historic Places in Oregon
Gothic Revival church buildings in Oregon
Churches completed in 1937
Buildings and structures in Lincoln County, Oregon
National Register of Historic Places in Lincoln County, Oregon
1937 establishments in Oregon